The Mohmand blockade (1916–1917) was a blockade formed by a series of blockhouses and barbed wire defences, along the Mohmand border on the North West Frontier by the Indian Army during World War I.

Background
In 1915 the Mohmand tribe declared a holy war or jihad against the British.  The blockade began after a number of Mohmand raids into Peshawar, they sent large numbers of lashkars (In Mughal and Urdu culture the word is used to describe a "swarm like formation in any army") at British positions. The most important engagement occurred on 15 November 1916, at Hafiz Kor, when a Mohmand force was defeated. The blockade was eventually lifted in July 1917 when the Mohmands finally submitted.

See also
Operations against the Mohmands, Bunerwals and Swatis in 1915

Bibliography 
Notes

References 

 - Total pages: 272

Military history of British India
Military history of Khyber Pakhtunkhwa
Battles of World War I involving British India
Mohmand campaigns